Platyzygaena is a genus of moths belonging to the family Zygaenidae.

Species
Species:

Platyzygaena melaleuca 
Platyzygaena moelleri

References

Zygaenidae
Zygaenidae genera